Robert Blair VC (13 March 1834 – 28 March 1859) was a Scottish recipient of the Victoria Cross, the highest and most prestigious award for gallantry in the face of the enemy that can be awarded to British and Commonwealth forces.

He was 23 years old, and a lieutenant in the 2nd Dragoon Guards (Queen's Bays), British Army, attached to 9th Lancers (The Queen's Royal) during the Indian Mutiny when the following deed took place on 28 September 1857 at Bulandshahr, India, for which he was awarded the VC.

Blair was a graduate of University of Glasgow and a Snell exhibitioner at Balliol College, Oxford. Blair joined the army in 1855 in the service of the 9th Lancers and later transferred to the 2nd Dragoon Guards. He later achieved the rank of captain and died of smallpox in Cawnpore, India, on 28 March 1859. He was the cousin of another Indian Mutiny VC recipient James Blair.

His Victoria Cross is displayed at the Queen's Dragoon Guards Regimental Museum in Cardiff Castle, Wales.

References

Monuments to Courage (David Harvey, 1999)
The Register of the Victoria Cross (This England, 1997)
Scotland's Forgotten Valour (Graham Ross, 1995)

1834 births
1859 deaths
2nd Dragoon Guards (Queen's Bays) officers
British recipients of the Victoria Cross
Indian Rebellion of 1857 recipients of the Victoria Cross
People from Linlithgow
People from West Lothian
Alumni of the University of Glasgow
Alumni of Balliol College, Oxford
Deaths from smallpox
Infectious disease deaths in India
British Army recipients of the Victoria Cross